is a manga series by Hidekaz Himaruya. The series chronicles the story of Seiji Chiga, a young man from Japan studying to become an artist on the island of Nantucket, Massachusetts, and his interactions with his new friends, during the 1960s (the Shōwa period in Japan).

Chibisan Date is the second manga by Himaruya to be published, the first being Hetalia: Axis Powers, and four tankōbon have been published by Gentosha Comics, the first on November 24, 2009, the second on February 24, 2012, and the third on December 24, 2012 and the fourth on June 24, 2013. In addition, it had been serialized in Comic Birz since the April 2009 issue. The series went on a year-long unannounced hiatus, with no new chapters serialized after the August 2010 issue. The series relaunched on October 28, 2011, in the first issue of Comic Spica. The series ended in the April 2013 issue of Comic Spica.

Plot
Chibisan Date focuses on Seiji Chiga, a young artist studying under Mr. Suehiro, a potter, on the island of Nantucket during the 1960s. A pessimist who doubts his abilities constantly, Seiji puts pressure on himself to place better in an art competition, and as a result suffers a creative block. Passing his time with his new friends - including a young girl known only as "Chibi-san", two teenage girls from Boston, and the son of a local fisherman - Seiji faces each day overcoming some small obstacle to reach a brighter outlook on life.

Characters

Full name . The primary protagonist, he is a worrier and pessimist, though a very talented artist who likes to draw. He is also a bit eccentric.

Seji's mentor and also a potter, having immigrated to the United States from Kagoshima Prefecture. He takes care of Seiji and is a calm, hardworking man.

The title character of the series. A mysterious and mischievous young girl whose backstory and significance to the story remains unknown. She loves to draw.

Full name Margaret Baker, Nicknamed "Meg". She is the younger of the Baker sisters. She is childish and cute, though more of a tomboy than Candy.

Full name Candy Baker. The elder of the two Baker sisters. She is reserved and somewhat snobby, but also quite cowardly and emotional.

Full name Reinhard Fischer. Seiji's best friend, who is described as understanding and caring. Though the two are total opposites in personality, their friendship seems to be quite strong.

Full name Rani Sujanta Sachdeva. The worker at a bookstore in Nantucket, run by Rocket's grandfather. She is a cheerful girl, yet also quite scatterbrained. Her dream is to become a successful picture book artist.

Real name Robert Wedgewood. A young boy who moved with his parents to Boston, though he currently lives at his grandparents' home. He has not shown up in the published manga yet, but in some exclusive strips of the series posted to Hidekaz Himaruya's blog. It is said that he is nicknamed Rocket due to his anger problems.

An eccentric illustrator that came from Brooklyn who is very fond of alcohol and women.

Media

Manga
Written and illustrated by Hidekaz Himaruya, the Chibisan Date chapters are serialized in Comic Birz. Gentosha has collected the chapters into one bound volume so far, published on November 24, 2009. Shortly after the first chapter was released, an online-exclusive chapter entitled , focusing on the supporting character Sujanta, was posted on Hidekaz Himaruya's blog.

In January 2009 Anime News Network reported that the series would also begin serialization in Gentosha's seinen manga magazine Comic Birz starting in the April issue, though it was initially reported that Himaruya's other series Hetalia: Axis Powers would be serialized. After a year-long hiatus from 2010 to 2011, it resumed serialization with the launch of the new magazine Comic Spica. Amazon.com has listed Chibisan Date as being licensed by Tokyopop for a North American release, with the first volume released on June 28, 2011, however Tokyopop has announced the shutdown of its US publishing operations at the end of May 2011.

Drama CD
In the July 2010 issue of Comic Birz it was announced that there would be a drama CD of Chibi-san Date. However, at the time of the manga's conclusion in 2013, no further news on the CD has materialized.

See also

 Hetalia: Axis Powers

References

External links
 Hidekaz Himaruya's official Chibisan Date website 
 Chibisan Date page on the Comic Birz website 
 Chibisan Date page on the Gentosha website 
 
 Chibisan Date Wiki - English Chibisan Date encyclopedia.

2009 manga
Drama anime and manga
Gentosha manga
Historical anime and manga